Sukhothai Airport  is a privately owned airport serving Sukhothai Province, Northern Thailand.

Airline and destination

External links

 
 

Airports in Thailand
Airports established in 1996